Phil and John was a contemporary Christian music duo from Mansfield who recorded and toured throughout the 1980s and 1990s.

History
Phil and John were Phil Baggaley and John Hartley, childhood friends who first started playing together at the age of 13. Their performances, which included an appearance at the Greenbelt festival in 1989,  typically incorporated music and comedy. Although no longer performing and recording as a group, both remained within the music business: Baggaley went on to establish Christian record label Gold Records, while Hartley moved to Nashville, Tennessee and became director of A&R for Worship Together Records.

The Wood Thieves
Whilst known for contemporary worship music as Phil and John, the duo also recorded secular music as "The Wood Thieves". Their most notable release in this capacity was a single with The Grimethorpe Colliery Band and was a response to announcement of the closure of Grimethorpe Colliery.

Awards 
 Special International GMA Dove Award 1990.

Discography

Studio albums 
 Count Me Out, Kingsway Music, 1983
 Waiting for Summer, Kingsway Music, 1985
 Lonely Dancer, What? Records, 1987
 Don't Look Now...It's The Hallelujah Brothers, What? Records, 1989
 Shine Like America, What? Records, 1990
 Carnival of Clowns, R Records, 1992
 Providence, Phoenix Records, 1997

Live albums 
 Phil and John Live, What? Records, 1990
 Breakfast at Ruby's, Kingsway Music, 1994

Compilation albums 
 Goodbye Yesterday: The Very Best of Phil And John, What? Records, 1992
 Simply Phil and John, Kingsway Music, 1995

Singles 
 You Wouldn't Let Me Go, Kingsway Music, 1982
 The Day the North Left Town (performing as The Wood Thieves, with The Grimethorpe Colliery Band), Rumour Records, 1992

Live videos 
 Live, What? Records, 1992

See also
 Gold records

References

English musical duos
English Christian musical groups
People from Mansfield
Musical groups from Nottinghamshire